Symbatica is a genus of moth in the family Gelechiidae.

Species
Symbatica cryphias Meyrick, 1910
Symbatica heimella Viette, 1954

References

Meyrick 1910b. New South African Microlepidoptera. - Annals of the South African Museum 5:411–417.

Gelechiinae
Taxa named by Edward Meyrick
Moth genera